Olga Vasilyeva is a former Russian football defender who represented Azerbaijan in international competitions. She spent her last three seasons in Zvezda Perm, with whom she won three Russian leagues and played the 2008-09 UEFA Women's Cup Final.

In 2021 she was named coach of the newly formed women's team of FC Rubin Kazan.

References

1974 births
Living people
People from Chuvashia
Sportspeople from Chuvashia
Soviet women's footballers
Russian emigrants to Azerbaijan
Naturalized citizens of Azerbaijan
Russian women's footballers
Azerbaijani women's footballers
Azerbaijan women's international footballers
FC Lada Togliatti (women) players
CSK VVS Samara (women's football club) players
Nadezhda Noginsk players
Zvezda 2005 Perm players
Women's association football defenders